The 1998 Copenhagen Open was a men's tennis tournament played on indoor carpet courts in Copenhagen, Denmark that was part of the International Series of the 1998 ATP Tour. It was the eleventh edition of the tournament and was held from 9 March through 15 March 1998.

Seeds
Champion seeds are indicated in bold text while text in italics indicates the round in which those seeds were eliminated.

Draw

Finals

References

External links
 https://www.atptour.com/en/scores/archive/copenhagen/481/1998/draws?matchtype=doubles Draw]

1998 Copenhagen Open – 2
1998 ATP Tour